The ham sandwich is a common type of sandwich. The bread may be fresh or toasted, and it can be made with a variety of toppings including cheese and vegetables like lettuce, tomato, onion or pickle slices. Various kinds of mustard and mayonnaise are also common.

Sliced bread, sliced cheese, and sliced cooked ham are very readily available in Western supermarkets and as a result ham sandwiches are quick and easy to prepare. They are a common component of a packed lunch.

Ham and cheese sandwich
The origin of the ham and cheese sandwich has been debated for a number of years by culinary intellectuals. The leading theory as to who first started to produce a ham, cheese and bread dish is mentioned in The Larousse Gastronomique 1961. Here it notes that Patrick Connolly, an 18th-century Irish immigrant to England, sold a bread dish which:

combined the remains of pig, cured and sliced with a topping of Leicester cheese and a kiss of egg yolk sauce (a form of mayonnaise) in a round bread roll. The dish was rather unimaginatively known as a Connolly and is still sometimes referred to as this in some parts of the Midlands in the UK.

In the UK, a common addition to a ham and cheese sandwich is pickle (a sweet, vinegary chutney originally by Branston); the snack is then known as a ham, cheese and pickle sandwich.

As recalled by ballpark concessionaire Harry Stevens in a 1924 interview, in 1894 ham and cheese sandwiches were the only food sold in New York baseball parks; frankfurters were introduced in 1909.

An Englishwoman, writing in 1923 of her passage through Ellis Island on a trip to the U.S., noted:

I was in fear and trembling, having heard so many tales of the abuse aliens receive there.... The attendants were very kind and not at all rough with us. It was the noon hour... in a little while porters came along with baskets of very good ham and cheese sandwiches and coffee for the grown-ups and milk for the babies.

Richard E. Byrd took ham and cheese sandwiches on his 1926 polar flight as did 1927 transatlantic fliers Chamberlin and Levine.

Consumption 
The British Sandwich Association says that the ham sandwich is the most popular sandwich in the UK, and a survey they conducted in 2001 saw ham as the second favourite filling behind cheese. 70% of the 1.8 billion sandwiches eaten in France in 2008 were ham sandwiches, prompting a French economic analysis firm to begin a 'jambon-beurre index', like the Big Mac Index, to compare prices across the country.

The world's longest ham sandwich was created by butcher Nico Jimenez in Pamplona, Spain in 2009.

Varieties 

In French cuisine, a croque-monsieur is a type of ham and cheese sandwich. It is baked or fried.

In Brazilian cuisine, this sandwich roasted is known as misto-quente ("hot mix" in literal translation).

The Cuban sandwich is made with ham, cheese, and crusty Cuban bread, often toasted in a panini press. Variations of this sandwich are popular in both Cuba and South Florida.

Health 
The World Cancer Research Fund warned in 2009 against parents feeding their children too many ham sandwiches, due to the risk of bowel cancer from the processed meat.

A ham sandwich was suspected of causing an outbreak of swine fever in the UK in 2000.

Cultural impact 
New York State chief judge Sol Wachtler was famously quoted by Tom Wolfe in The Bonfire of the Vanities that "a grand jury would 'indict a ham sandwich,' if that's what you wanted."

A fictional talking ham sandwich appeared in an online noir serial in the late 1990s, and the publishers sued in 1999 when a similar character appeared in a television advertisement for Florida orange juice, though the suit was withdrawn.

The name "ham sandwich" is sometimes used (particularly by the New Orleans Police Department) to refer to a firearm planted at a crime scene by police as false evidence.

Singer Cass Elliot died in 1974, and it was widely reported that she had choked on a ham sandwich.  This was untrue; Elliot suffered a heart attack in her sleep.

See also 
 List of ham dishes
 List of sandwiches
 Grilled cheese
Bologna sandwich
SPAM
 
Ham sandwich theorem

References

External links 
 
 

British sandwiches
Ham dishes
Pork sandwiches